Nuclear graphite is any grade of graphite, usually synthetic graphite, manufactured for use as a moderator or reflector within a nuclear reactor. Graphite is an important material for the construction of both historical and modern nuclear reactors, due to its extreme purity and ability to withstand extremely high temperature. Graphite has also recently been used in nuclear fusion reactors such as the Wendelstein 7-X. As of experiments published in 2019, graphite in elements of the stellarator's wall and a graphite island divertor have greatly improved plasma performance within the device, yielding better control over impurity and heat exhaust, and long high-density discharges.

History

Nuclear fission, the creation of a nuclear chain reaction in uranium, was discovered in 1939 following experiments by Otto Hahn and Fritz Strassman, and the interpretation of their results by physicists such as Lise Meitner and Otto Frisch. Shortly thereafter, word of the discovery spread throughout the international physics community. 

In order for the fission process to chain react, the neutrons created by uranium fission must be slowed down by interacting with a neutron moderator (an element with a low atomic weight, that will "bounce", when hit by a neutron) before they will be captured by other uranium atoms. By late 1939, it became well known that the two most promising moderators were heavy water and graphite.

In February 1940, using funds that were allocated partly as a result of the Einstein-Szilard letter to President Roosevelt, Leo Szilard purchased several tons of graphite from the Speer Carbon Company and from the National Carbon Company (the National Carbon Division of the Union Carbide and Carbon Corporation in Cleveland, Ohio) for use in Enrico Fermi's first fission experiments, the so-called exponential pile. Fermi writes that "The results of this experiment was [sic] somewhat discouraging" presumably due to the absorption of neutrons by some unknown impurity. So, in December 1940 Fermi and Szilard met with Herbert G. MacPherson and V. C. Hamister at National Carbon to discuss the possible existence of impurities in graphite. During this conversation it became clear that minute quantities of boron impurities were the source of the problem.

As a result of this meeting, over the next two years, MacPherson and Hamister developed thermal and gas extraction purification techniques at National Carbon for the production of boron-free graphite. The resulting product was designated AGOT Graphite ("Acheson Graphite Ordinary Temperature") by National Carbon, and it was "the first true nuclear grade graphite".

During this period, Fermi and Szilard purchased graphite from several manufacturers with various degrees of neutron absorption cross section: AGX graphite from National Carbon Company with 6.68 mb (millibarns) cross section, US graphite from United States Graphite Company with 6.38 mb cross section, Speer graphite from the Speer Carbon Company with 5.51 mb cross section, and when it became available, AGOT graphite from National Carbon, with 4.97 mb cross section. (See also Haag [2005].) By November 1942 National Carbon had shipped 250 tons of AGOT graphite to the University of Chicago where it became the primary source of graphite to be used in the construction of Fermi's Chicago Pile-1, the first nuclear reactor to generate a sustained chain reaction (December 2, 1942). AGOT graphite was used to build the X-10 graphite reactor in Oak Ridge TN (early 1943) and the first reactors at the Hanford Site in Washington (mid 1943), for the production of plutonium during and after World War II. The AGOT process and its later refinements became standard techniques in the manufacture of nuclear graphite.

The neutron cross section of graphite was also investigated during the second world war in Germany by Walter Bothe, P. Jensen, and Werner Heisenberg. The purest graphite available to them was a product from the Siemens Plania company, which exhibited a neutron absorption cross section of about 6.4 mb to 7.5 mb (Haag 2005). Heisenberg therefore decided that graphite would be unsuitable as a moderator in a reactor design using natural uranium, due to this apparently high rate of neutron absorption. Consequently, the German effort to create a chain reaction involved attempts to use heavy water, an expensive and scarce alternative, made all the more difficult to acquire as a consequence of the Norwegian heavy water sabotage by Norwegian and Allied forces. Writing as late as 1947, Heisenberg still did not understand that the only problem with graphite was the boron impurity.

Wigner effect

In December 1942 Eugene Wigner suggested that neutron bombardment might introduce dislocations and other damage in the molecular structure of materials such as the graphite moderator in a nuclear reactor (the Wigner effect). The resulting buildup of energy in the material became a matter of concern The possibility was suggested that graphite bars might fuse together as chemical bonds at the surface of the bars when opened and closed again. Even the possibility that the graphite parts might very quickly break into small pieces could not be ruled out. However, the first power-producing reactors (X-10 Graphite Reactor and Hanford B Reactor) had to be built without such knowledge. Cyclotrons, which were the only fast neutron sources available, would take several months to produce neutron irradiation equivalent to one day in a Hanford reactor.

This was the starting point for large-scale research programmes to investigate the property changes due to fast particle radiation and to predict their influence on the safety and the lifetime of graphite reactors to be built. Influences of fast neutron radiation on strength, electrical and thermal conductivity, thermal expansivity, dimensional stability, on the storage of internal energy (Wigner energy), and on many other properties have been observed many times and in many countries after the first results emerged from the X-10 reactor in 1944.

Although catastrophic behaviour such as fusion or crumbling of graphite pieces has never occurred, large changes in many properties do result from fast neutron irradiation which need to be taken into account when graphite components of nuclear reactors are designed. Although not all effects are well understood yet, more than 100 graphite reactors have successfully operated for decades since the 1940s. A few severe accidents in graphite reactors can in no case be attributed to insufficient information (at the time of design) regarding the properties of the graphite in use. In the 2010s, the collection of new material property data has improved knowledge significantly.

Purity
Reactor-grade graphite must be free of neutron absorbing materials, especially boron, which has a large neutron capture cross section. Boron sources in graphite include the raw materials, the packing materials used in baking the product, and even the choice of soap (for example, borax) used to launder the clothing worn by workers in the machine shop. Boron concentration in thermally purified graphite (such as AGOT graphite) can be less than 0.4 ppm and in chemically purified nuclear graphite it is less than 0.06 ppm.

Behaviour under irradiation

This describes the behavior of nuclear graphite, specifically when exposed to fast neutron irradiation.

Specific phenomena addressed:
Dimensional change (shrinkage and neutron-induced swelling, as well as possible hardening)
Change in elastic modulus (measured by impulse excitation technique)
Change in coefficient of thermal expansion
Change in thermal conductivity
Change in electrical resistivity
Irradiation induced creep

As the state of nuclear graphite in active reactors can only be determined at routine inspections, about every 18 months, mathematical modelling of the nuclear graphite as it approached end-of-life is important. However as only surface features can be inspected, and the exact time of changes is not known, reliability modelling is especially difficult.

Manufacture
Nuclear graphite for the UK Magnox reactors was manufactured from petroleum coke mixed with coal-based binder pitch heated and extruded into billets, and then baked at 1,000 °C for several days. To reduce porosity and increase density, the billets were impregnated with coal tar at high temperature and pressure before a final bake at 2,800 °C. Individual billets were then machined into the final required shapes.

Accidents in graphite-moderated reactors

There have been two major accidents in graphite-moderated reactors, the Windscale fire and the Chernobyl disaster.

In the Windscale fire, an untested annealing process for the graphite was used, causing overheating in unmonitored areas of the core and leading directly to the ignition of the fire. The material that ignited was not the graphite moderator itself, but rather the canisters of metallic uranium fuel within the reactor. When the fire was extinguished, it was found that the only areas of the graphite moderator to have incurred thermal damage were those that had been close to the burning fuel canisters.

In the Chernobyl disaster, the moderator was not responsible for the primary event. Instead, a massive power excursion during a mishandled test caused the catastrophic failure of the reactor vessel and a near-total loss of coolant supply. The result was that the fuel rods rapidly melted and flowed together while in an extremely high power state, causing a small portion of the core to reach a state of runaway prompt criticality and leading to a massive energy release, resulting in the explosion of the reactor core and the destruction of the reactor building. The massive energy release during the primary event superheated the graphite moderator, and the disruption of the reactor vessel and building allowed the superheated graphite to come into contact with atmospheric oxygen. As a result, the graphite moderator caught fire, sending a plume of highly radioactive fallout into the atmosphere and over a very widespread area.

References
Haag, G. 2005, Properties of ATR-2E Graphite and Property Changes due to Fast Neutron Irradiation, FZ-Juelich, Juel-4813.

External links
Manufacturing and Production of Graphite, IAEA Nuclear Graphite Knowledge Base
Graphite Behaviour under Irradiation, IAEA Nuclear Graphite Knowledge Base

Allotropes of carbon
Neutron moderators
Nuclear technology